Atropo was the name of at least two ships of the Italian Navy and may refer to:

 , a submarine launched in 1912 and discarded in 1919.
 , a  launched in 1938 and discarded in 1947.

Italian Navy ship names